Accused is a British television anthology series created by Jimmy McGovern. The drama series first aired on 15 November 2010 on BBC One and has run for two series. Each episode follows a different character as they await their verdict in court, and tells the story behind how they find themselves accused. The series has featured actors and actresses such as Christopher Eccleston, Benjamin Smith, Juliet Stevenson, Andy Serkis, Marc Warren, Naomie Harris, Sean Bean and Anne-Marie Duff as the accused in each episode.

The series follows previous drama series by McGovern, including anthology series The Street and Moving On. After the cancellation of The Street in 2009 by Granada Television, McGovern formed RSJ Films to produce independent drama programmes and subsequently devised the Accused anthology series. Accused was written by McGovern, Danny Brocklehurst and Alice Nutter and was filmed in Manchester. In 2011 it won an International Emmy for best drama series.

Production

Series One
The series was commissioned by Jay Hunt and Ben Stephenson, controllers of BBC One and Drama Commissioning respectively, and announced in May 2010. Each episode revolves around a different character as they make their way to the dock in court to hear whether they've been found guilty of a crime. As they walk, the events that led up to them being accused of the crime play out and leave the viewers questioning whether each of the people are really guilty or not. McGovern said of the series:

McGovern was the lead writer for the series, with co-writers Alice Nutter, Danny Brocklehurst and Esther Wilson for episodes three, four and five respectively. The series was directed by David Blair (episodes 1, 2, 5 and 6) and Richard Laxton (episodes 3 and 4), and produced by RSJ Films, a company founded by Jimmy McGovern, Sita Williams and Roxy Spencer. RSJ Films is also known for making the award-winning BBC series The Street. Filming for the series took place around Manchester between May and August 2010.

A number of the cast were announced along with the series: Christopher Eccleston and Pooky Quesnel feature in "Willy's Story"; and Mackenzie Crook, Robert Pugh, Benjamin Smith and Ben Batt feature in "The Soldier Story" (changed to "Frankie's Story"). It was announced in June 2010 that Juliet Stevenson and Peter Capaldi had been cast to star in "Helen's Story", and Andy Serkis would be in "Liam's Story". In July 2010, Naomie Harris was cast in "Alison's Story", and in August Marc Warren was cast in "Kenny's Story".

Series Two

On 24 February 2011, BBC Drama Controller Ben Stephenson announced that Accused has been renewed for a second series of four episodes, to be broadcast sometime in 2012. Despite the relatively low viewing figures from the first series, the second was commissioned in the hopes that it would have the potential to find a broader audience.

Filming for the first two episodes of the second series began around November 2011. The new cast members confirmed to appear in these episodes included Anne-Marie Duff, Olivia Colman, Robert Sheehan, Joe Dempsie, Sheridan Smith, Paul Popplewell and comedian John Bishop. The first episode, starring Colman and Duff, would be written by McGovern and Carol Cullington, while writing credits on the second episode (starring Sheehan, Bishop and Smith) would again be shared by Daniel Brocklehurst and McGovern.

In January 2012, it was confirmed that Anna Maxwell Martin would join Sheehan and Bishop in the second episode. It was also announced that Sean Bean had joined the cast as "an English teacher who has a cross-dressing alter ego", and would star in an episode alongside Stephen Graham, which would be co-written by McGovern and Shaun Duggan and directed by Ashley Pearce.

The first episode of series 2 was aired on 14 August 2012, following a large advertising campaign. The final episode included a different concept from the rest of the two series: although none are the lead character, four characters (Jake, Stephen, Stephen's father and the judge) from previous episodes appear and are significant towards the story. On the DVD release of series 2, "Tracie's story" was moved from the start of the series to the end for an unknown reason, though this does not affect the chronology of the overlapping plots in the other three episodes.

Episodes

Series 1

Series 2

Reception
Reviewing the first episode, Lucy Mangan for The Guardian said, "It was – as ever with the writer of The Street, Cracker and Hillsborough – a compelling dissection of the fragility of ordinary lives, but you did long for just a little light and shade." The Independent'''s Brian Viner praised the actors, including Eccleston, and the story for being about a plumber living "in an ordinary house in an unremarkable Northern town" and not about "a detective, or a doctor, barrister, architect or spy". In The Herald, Damien Love also praised Eccleston's "brilliant" and "electrifying" performance, and said, "It's a strange, spiky programme, never perfect, but supremely watchable".

The controversial second episode was reviewed by Pete Naughton for The Daily Telegraph, who said, "what McGovern tried and largely succeeded to do was to paint a compelling picture of the brutality that can arise when men under high levels of stress turn on one another" and that "it seemed clear early on that this was a drama about institutionalised bullying whose characters happened to be soldiers, rather than an attempt at a journalistic-style exposé of bullying within the Army". In The Guardian, John Crace found it "compelling": "McGovern remains one of the best TV writers in the business and if he does tend to get carried away with torturing his own characters, you can forgive him because of the pace and economy with which he delivers the story." Asking if it was good enough, Brian Viner for The Independent'' praised the acting and Crook's performance, and said: "McGovern's manifold skills shone through, too. ... However, I thought "Willy's Story" last week a finer piece of drama, character-led where this was issue-led, leaving too many questions unresolved."

Although critically successful the show was not a ratings success. The show opened with 5.39 million viewers but ended with 3.19 million viewers.

American adaptation

In May 2021, Fox ordered an American adaptation of the series. It will be co-produced between Sony Pictures Television, 
All3Media America and Fox Entertainment and scheduled to premiere in the 2022–23 television season with Howard Gordon, Alex Gansa and David Shore as executive producers. It had premiered on January 22, 2023.

Awards and nominations

References

External links
 
 
 

2010s British drama television series
2010 British television series debuts
2012 British television series endings
2010s British anthology television series
BBC television dramas
2010s British legal television series
British legal drama television series
English-language television shows
International Emmy Award for Best Drama Series winners
Murder in television
Rape in television
Television series by All3Media